Hugo Laurenz August Hofmann von Hofmannsthal (1 February 1874 – 15 July 1929) was an Austrian novelist, librettist, poet, dramatist, narrator, and essayist.

Early life

Hofmannsthal was born in Landstraße, Vienna, the son of an upper-class Christian Austrian mother, Anna Maria Josefa Fohleutner (1852–1904), and a Christian Austrian–Italian bank manager, Hugo August Peter Hofmann, Edler von Hofmannsthal (1841–1915).

His grandfather was Augustin Emil Hofmann von Hofmannsthal and his great-grandfather was Isaak Löw Hofmann, Edler von Hofmannsthal, from whom his family inherited the noble title "Edler von Hofmannsthal", was a Jewish tobacco farmer ennobled by the Austrian emperor.

He was schooled in Vienna at Akademisches Gymnasium, where he studied the works of Ovid, later a major influence on his work. He began to write poems and plays from an early age. Some of his early works were written under pseudonyms, such as Loris Melikow and Theophil Morren, because he was not allowed to publish as a student. He met the German poet Stefan George at the age of seventeen and had several poems published in George's journal, Blätter für die Kunst. He studied law and later philology at the University of Vienna but decided to devote himself to writing upon graduating in 1901. Along with Peter Altenberg and Arthur Schnitzler, he was a member of the avant garde group Young Vienna (Jung–Wien).

Career

In 1900 Hofmannsthal met the composer Richard Strauss for the first time. He later wrote libretti for several of his operas, including Elektra (1909), Der Rosenkavalier (1911), the plot of which he developed together with Harry Graf Kessler, Ariadne auf Naxos (1912, rev. 1916), Die Frau ohne Schatten (1919), Die ägyptische Helena (1928), and Arabella (1929, but first performed in 1933).

In 1911 he adapted the 15th century English morality play Everyman as Jedermann, and Einar Nilson wrote the music for it. The play later became a staple at the Salzburg Festival.

During World War I Hofmannsthal held a government post. He wrote speeches and articles supporting the war effort, and emphasizing the cultural tradition of Austria-Hungary. The end of the war spelled the end of the Habsburg monarchy in Austria; this was a blow from which the patriotic and conservative-minded Hofmannsthal never fully recovered.

Nevertheless, the years after the war were very productive ones for Hofmannsthal; he continued with his earlier literary projects, almost without a break. He wrote several new libretti for Richard Strauss operas. In 1920, Hofmannsthal, along with Max Reinhardt, founded the Salzburg Festival. His later plays revealed a growing interest in religious, particularly Roman Catholic, themes. Among his writings was a screenplay for a film version of Der Rosenkavalier (1925) directed by Robert Wiene.

Thought
On 18 October 1902 Hofmannsthal published a fictive letter in the Berlin Daily, Der Tag (The Day) titled simply "Ein Brief" ("A Letter"). It was purportedly written in 1603 by Philip, Lord Chandos, to Francis Bacon. In this letter Chandos says that he has stopped writing because he has "lost completely the ability to think or to speak of anything coherently"; he has given up on the possibility of language to describe the world. This letter reflects the growing distrust of and dissatisfaction with language that so characterizes the Modern era, and Chandos's dissolving personality is not only individual but societal.

Growing up the son of a wealthy merchant who was well connected with the major artists of the time, Hofmannsthal was raised in what Carl Schorske refers to as "the temple of art". This perfect setting for aesthetic isolation allowed Hofmannsthal the unique perspective of the privileged artist, but also allowed him to see that art had become a flattened documenting of humanity, which took our instincts and desires and framed them for viewing without acquiring any of the living, passionate elements. Because of this realization, Hofmannsthal’s idea of the role of the artist began to take shape as someone who created works that would inspire or inflame the instinct, rather than merely preserving it in a creative form. He also began to think that the artist should not be someone isolated and left to his art, but rather a man of the world, immersed in both politics and art.

Hofmannsthal saw in English culture the ideal setting for the artist. This was because the English simultaneously admired Admiral Nelson and John Milton, both war heroes and poets, while still maintaining a solid national identity. "In [Hofmannsthal’s] view, the division between artist (writer) and man of action (politician, explorer, soldier) does not exist in England. Britain provides her subjects with a common base of energy which functions as equilibrium, a force lacking in fragmented Germany" (Weiss). This singular and yet pragmatic identity must have appealed to Hofmannsthal to a certain degree due to the large scale fragmentation of Austria at the time, which was witnessing the birth of radical nationalism and anti-Semitism, a nation in which the progressive artist and the progressive politician were growing more different and hostile to each other by the day.

Influence 
The Austrian author Stefan Zweig wrote in his memoirs The World of Yesterday (1942) on Hofmannsthal's early accomplishments and their influence on Zweig's generation:

Personal life

In 1901 he married Gertrud "Gerty" Schlesinger, the daughter of a Viennese Jewish banker. Gerty converted to Christianity before their marriage, and they settled in Rodaun (now part of Liesing), not far from Vienna, and had three children:

 Christiane von Hofmannsthal (1902–1987), who married German indologist Heinrich Zimmer in early 1929. Zimmer taught at University of Greifswald, Heidelberg University, and Balliol College, Oxford. After they moved to New Rochelle, he became a visiting lecturer at Columbia University.
 Franz von Hofmannsthal (1903–1929), who committed suicide on 13 July 1929.
 Raimund von Hofmannsthal (1906–1974), who married Ava Alice Muriel Astor, daughter of John Jacob Astor IV and Ava Lowle Willing in 1933. After divorcing Ava in 1939, Raimund later married Lady Elizabeth Paget, daughter of the 6th Marquess of Anglesey.

Two days after his elder son Franz committed suicide, Hugo himself died of a stroke while dressing for his funeral at Rodaun. He was buried wearing the habit of a Franciscan tertiary, as he had requested. His widow, who acquired Schloss Prielau in 1932, died in London in 1959.

Selected works
Plays
Libretti
Narrations and fictitious conversations
Novel (fragment)
Essays, speeches, prose
Poetry

References

Further reading
 This article incorporates material from the German Wikipedia article.
 HUGO VON HOFMANNSTHAL, SELECT NARRATIVE PROSE, Translated with an Introduction by ALEXANDER STILLMARK,Ariadne Press, Riverside, CA, 2020.
 HUGO VON HOFMANNSTHAL, THE INCORRUPTIBLE SERVANT, (Der Unbestechliche)  Translated with an Introduction by ALEXANDER STILLMARK (Modern Humanities Association, Cambridge 2021).

External links

 
Hugo von Hofmannthal Resource Center
University of Washington Vienna 1900 Page
 

1874 births
1929 deaths
19th-century Austrian dramatists and playwrights
19th-century Austrian male writers
19th-century Austrian poets
20th-century Austrian dramatists and playwrights
20th-century Austrian male writers
20th-century Austrian novelists
Austrian male dramatists and playwrights
Austrian male novelists
Austrian male poets
Austrian monarchists
Austrian opera librettists
Austrian people of Jewish descent
Austrian Roman Catholics
Ballet librettists
Catholic poets
Edlers of Austria
German-language poets
Hugo
Jewish dramatists and playwrights
People from Landstraße
People from Liesing
Symbolist dramatists and playwrights
Young Vienna
Conservatism in Austria